Ravenstahl is a surname. It may refer to:

Adam Ravenstahl (born 1984), American politician, Democratic member of the Pennsylvania House of Representatives
Luke Ravenstahl (born 1980), American politician, Mayor of Pittsburgh from 2006 until 2014
Robert Ravenstahl, Sr. (1924–2015), American politician, Democratic member of the Pennsylvania House of Representatives